James H. Lang (October 3, 1901 – October 25, 1976) was an American football player.

A native of Fort William, Scotland, Lang played professional football in the National Football League (NFL) as a tackle for the Duluth Eskimos during the 1927 season and for the Chicago Cardinals during the 1929 season. He appeared in a total of five NFL games, three of them as a starter.

References

1901 births
1976 deaths
Duluth Eskimos players
Chicago Cardinals players
Scottish players of American football